Catopta saldaitisi is a moth in the family Cossidae. It was described by Yakovlev in 2007. It is found in Gobi-Altai and the southern part of the Mongolian Altai mountains.

The length of the forewings is 16–18 mm.

References

Natural History Museum Lepidoptera generic names catalog

Moths described in 2007
Catoptinae